Mapado is a 2005 South Korean film directed by Choo Chang-min.

Plot
A gangster and a corrupt police officer travel to the tiny remote island of Mapado to hunt down a young woman who has run off with a winning lottery ticket. Upon arriving, they discover that no one lives there except for five old women who have not once seen a man for 20 years. Both men soon experience a nightmare of hard labour and harassment.

Title
Do can either mean "province" or "island" in Korean. Seom means island in the Korean language as well, although "do" is a Sino-Korean word used in name compound words, but "seom" can stand alone. Filming for Mapado did not take place on an island, but in Dongbaek village in Yeonggwang County, South Korea.

References

External links
 
 
 

2005 films
2005 black comedy films
South Korean black comedy films
Films set on islands
Films directed by Choo Chang-min
2000s Korean-language films
2005 directorial debut films
2005 comedy films
2000s South Korean films